Bioadhesives are natural polymeric materials that act as adhesives. The term is sometimes used more loosely to describe a glue formed synthetically from biological monomers such as sugars, or to mean a synthetic material designed to adhere to biological tissue.

Bioadhesives may consist of a variety of substances, but proteins and carbohydrates feature prominently. Proteins such as gelatin and carbohydrates such as starch have been used as general-purpose glues by man for many years, but typically their performance shortcomings have seen them replaced by synthetic alternatives. Highly effective adhesives found in the natural world are currently under investigation but not yet in widespread commercial use. For example, bioadhesives secreted by microbes and by marine molluscs and crustaceans are being researched with a view to biomimicry. Furthermore, thiolation of proteins and carbohydrates enables these polymers (thiomers) to covalently adhere especially to cysteine-rich subdomains of proteins such as keratins or mucus glycoproteins via disulfide bond formation. Thiolated chitosan and thiolated hyaluronic acid are used as bioadhesives in various medicinal products.

Bioadhesives are of commercial interest because they tend to be biocompatible, i.e. useful for biomedical applications involving skin or other body tissue. Some work in wet environments and under water, while others can stick to low surface energy – non-polar surfaces like plastic. In recent years, the synthetic adhesives industry has been impacted by environmental concerns and health and safety issues relating to hazardous ingredients, volatile organic compound emissions, and difficulties in recycling or re mediating adhesives derived from petrochemical feedstocks. Rising oil prices may also stimulate commercial interest in biological alternatives to synthetic adhesives.

Examples of bioadhesives in nature 
Organisms may secrete bioadhesives for use in attachment, construction and obstruction, as well as in predation and defense. Examples include their use for:
 Colonization of surfaces (e.g. bacteria, algae, fungi, mussels, barnacles, rotifers)
 Mussel's byssal threads
 Tube building by polychaete worms, which live in underwater mounds
 Insect egg, larval or pupal attachment to surfaces (vegetation, rocks), and insect mating plugs
 Host attachment by blood-feeding ticks
 Nest-building by some insects, and also by some fish (e.g. the three-spined stickleback)
 Defense by Notaden frogs and by sea cucumbers
 Prey capture in spider webs and by velvet worms

Some bioadhesives are very strong. For example, adult barnacles achieve pull-off forces as high as 2 MPa (2 N/mm2). A similarly strong, rapidly adhering glue - which contains 171 different proteins and can adhere to wet, moist and impure surfaces - is produced by the very hard limpet species Patella vulgata; this adhesive material is a very interesting subject of research in the development of surgical adhesives and several other applications. Silk dope can also be used as a glue by arachnids and insects.

Polyphenolic proteins
The small family of proteins that are sometimes referred to as polyphenolic proteins are produced by some marine invertebrates like the blue mussel, Mytilus edulis by some algae', and by the polychaete Phragmatopoma californica. These proteins contain a high level of a post-translationally modified—oxidized—form of tyrosine, L-3,4-dihydroxyphenylalanine (levodopa, L-DOPA) as well as the disulfide (oxidized) form of cysteine (cystine). In the zebra mussel (Dreissena polymorpha), two such proteins, Dpfp-1 and Dpfp-2, localize in the juncture between byssus threads and adhesive plaque. The presence of these proteins appear, generally, to contribute to stiffening of the materials functioning as bioadhesives. The presence of the dihydroxyphenylalanine-moiety arises from action of a tyrosine hydroxylase-type of enzyme; in vitro, it has been shown that the proteins can be cross-linked (polymerized) using a mushroom tyrosinase.

Temporary adhesion 
Organisms such as limpets and sea stars use suction and mucus-like slimes to create Stefan adhesion, which makes pull-off much harder than lateral drag; this allows both attachment and mobility. Spores, embryos and juvenile forms may use temporary adhesives (often glycoproteins) to secure their initial attachment to surfaces favorable for colonization. Tacky and elastic secretions that act as pressure-sensitive adhesives, forming immediate attachments on contact, are preferable in the context of self-defense and predation. Molecular mechanisms include non-covalent interactions and polymer chain entanglement. Many biopolymers – proteins, carbohydrates, glycoproteins, and mucopolysaccharides – may be used to form hydrogels that contribute to temporary adhesion.

Permanent adhesion 

Many permanent bioadhesives (e.g., the oothecal foam of the mantis) are generated by a "mix to activate" process that involves hardening via covalent cross-linking. On non-polar surfaces the adhesive mechanisms may include van der Waals forces, whereas on polar surfaces mechanisms such as hydrogen bonding and binding to (or forming bridges via) metal cations may allow higher sticking forces to be achieved.
 Microorganisms use acidic polysaccharides (molecular mass around 100 000 Da)
 Marine bacteria use carbohydrate exopolymers to achieve bond strengths to glass of up to 500 000 N/m2
 Marine invertebrates commonly employ protein-based glues for irreversible attachment. Some mussels achieve 800 000 N/m2 on polar surfaces and 30 000 N/m2 on non-polar surfaces these numbers are dependent on the environment, mussels in high predation environments have an increased attachment to substrates. In high predation environments it can require predators 140% more force to dislodge mussels
 Some algae and marine invertebrates use lecproteins that contain L-DOPA to effect adhesion
 Proteins in the oothecal foam of the mantis are cross-linked covalently by small molecules related to L-DOPA via a tanning reaction that is catalysed by catechol oxidase or polyphenol oxidase enzymes.

L-DOPA is a tyrosine residue that bears an additional hydroxyl group. The twin hydroxyl groups in each side-chain compete well with water for binding to surfaces, form polar attachments via hydrogen bonds, and chelate the metals in mineral surfaces. The Fe(L-DOPA3) complex can itself account for much cross-linking and cohesion in mussel plaque, but in addition the iron catalyses oxidation of the L-DOPA to reactive quinone free radicals, which go on to form covalent bonds.

Applications 
Shellac is an early example of a bioadhesive put to practical use. Additional examples now exist, with others in development:
 Commodity wood adhesive based on a bacterial exopolysaccharide
 USB PRF/Soy 2000, a commodity wood adhesive that is 50% soy hydrolysate and excels at finger-jointing green lumber
 Mussel adhesive proteins can assist in attaching cells to plastic surfaces in laboratory cell and tissue culture experiments (see External Links)
 The Notaden frog glue is under development for biomedical uses, e.g. as a surgical glue for orthopedic applications or as a hemostat
 Mucosal drug delivery applications. For example, films of mussel adhesive protein give comparable mucoadhesion to polycarbophil, a synthetic hydrogel used to achieve effective drug delivery at low drug doses. An increased residence time through adhesion to the mucosal surface, such as in the eye or the nose can lead to an improved absorption of the drug.
 Long-duration continuous imaging of diverse organs (via a wearable bioadhesive stretchable high-resolution ultrasound imaging patch, potentially enabling novel diagnostic and monitoring tools)

Several commercial methods of production are being researched:
 Direct chemical synthesis, e.g. incorporation of L-DOPA groups in synthetic polymers
 Fermentation of transgenic bacteria or yeasts that express bioadhesive protein genes
 Farming of natural organisms (small and large) that secrete bioadhesive materials

Mucoadhesion 
A more specific term than bioadhesion is mucoadhesion. Most mucosal surfaces such as in the gut or nose are covered by a layer of mucus. Adhesion of a matter to this layer is hence called mucoadhesion. Mucoadhesive agents are usually polymers containing hydrogen bonding groups that can be used in wet formulations or in dry powders for drug delivery purposes. The mechanisms behind mucoadhesion have not yet been fully elucidated, but a generally accepted theory is that close contact must first be established between the mucoadhesive agent and the mucus, followed by interpenetration of the mucoadhesive polymer and the mucin and finishing with the formation of entanglements and chemical bonds between the macromolecules. In the case of a dry polymer powder, the initial adhesion is most likely achieved by water movement from the mucosa into the formulation, which has also been shown to lead to dehydration and strengthening of the mucus layer. The subsequent formation of van der Waals, hydrogen and, in the case of a positively charged polymer, electrostatic bonds between the mucins and the hydrated polymer promotes prolonged adhesion.

See also 
Mucilage

References

External links 
 "Mussels inspire new surgical glue possibilities". ScienceDaily article, Dec 2007.
 Frog glue story on ABC TV science program Catalyst.
 "Marine algae hold key to better biomedical adhesives", Biomaterials for healthcare: a decade of EU-funded research, p. 23
 Thesis on mucoadhesive gels
 "Marie Curie Project on bioadhesion  using the Cnidarian Hydra as model organisms 
 

Adhesives
Biomolecules
Animal proteins